The Northwestern Wildcats women's basketball team is the intercollegiate women's basketball program representing Northwestern University. The school competes in the Big Ten Conference in Division I of the National Collegiate Athletic Association (NCAA). The Wildcats play home basketball games at Welsh-Ryan Arena on the university campus in Evanston, Illinois, but played the 2017–18 season at Beardsley Gym on the nearby campus of Evanston Township High School during renovations to Welsh–Ryan Arena.

History

Early years (1975–1984)
The Wildcats began play in women's basketball in 1975, with Mary DiStanislao as the first head coach, who coached for five seasons, with the final two resulting in appearances in the AIAW Tournament. In 1980, Annette Lynch took over as head coach, leading the team to postseason appearances (AIAW and NCAA) in her first two seasons, with the latter (1981) being the first season in the Big Ten Conference.

Don Perrelli era (1985–1999)
In 1984, Don Perrelli became head coach of the Wildcats. In his 15-year tenure, he led the team to 5 appearances in the NCAA Tournament, a Big Ten title in 1990 (with a 24–5 record, 15–3 conference record), and a NWIT appearance. Perrelli retired after the 1998–99 season.

Decline (1999–2008)
June Olkowski took over, coaching Northwestern for five seasons, but she was fired after finishing 10th or worse each time, never winning more than three conference games. Beth Combs was hired to coach the Wildcats in 2004, but she was fired after four seasons, highlighted with winning only 7 conference games in 4 years and never finishing higher than 10th place.

Joe McKeown era (2008–present)
Joe McKeown was hired for the 2008 season. After a 10th-place finish in his first season, they finished tied for 8th in the conference (good enough to qualify for the WNIT) the following season, their highest finish since the 1998 season. After appearing in the WNIT twice in the following four seasons, the Wildcats returned to the NCAA Women's Division I Basketball Tournament in 2015, their first appearance since 1997, in a season where they had their highest finish in the conference (1994) since 1996.

All-Time Statistical Leaders

Career leaders
Points scored: 2,307 (Anucha Browne – 1982–85)
Assists: 892 (Nancy Kennelly – 1989–93)
Rebounds: 951 (Anucha Browne – 1982–85)
Steals: 236 (Moira Kennelly – 1991–94)
Blocks: 357 (Amy Jaeschke – 2007–2011)

Single season leaders
Points scored: 855 (Anucha Browne – 1985)
Assists: 252 (Nancy Kennelly – 1991 and 1993)
Rebounds: 305 (Patricia Babcock – 1993)
Steals: 95 (Ashley Deary – 2014–15)
Blocks: 106 (Amy Jaeschke – 2009–10)

Single game leaders
Points scored: 45 (Anucha Browne vs. St. John’s – 1984)
Assists: 16 (Nancy Kennelly vs. Eastern Illinois – 1993)
Rebounds: 26 (Julie Calahan vs. Indiana – 1981)
Steals: 11 (Moira Kennelly vs. UW-Milwaukee – 1993)
Blocks: 10 (Amy Jaeschke vs. Chicago State – 2010)

Big Ten Medal of Honor
1982 – Patience Vanderbush
1985 – Anucha Browne
1992 – Michele Savage
1993 – Nancy Kennelly
1997 – Michele Ratay
1999 – Megan Chawansky

Coaching history

Postseason

NCAA Division I Women's Basketball tournament
The Wildcats have appeared in the NCAA Division I women's basketball tournament eight times. They have a record of 4–7.

NIT results
The Wildcats have appeared in the Women's National Invitation Tournament (WNIT) five times, having a combined record of 10–5. They also appeared in the National Women's Invitational Tournament (the precursor to the WNIT, with 8 teams instead of the traditional 64 the WNIT has) once, having a record of 2–1.

AIAW Women's Basketball tournament
The Wildcats appeared in the AIAW women's basketball tournament (the precursor to the modern NCAA Women's Division I Basketball Championship) three times (the first being in a 16 team tournament and the latter two being in a 24 team tournament) before it was discontinued in 1982. They compiled a record of 1–3. They received a bye in 1980.

References

External links